The 1880 United States presidential election in Georgia took place on November 2, 1880, as part of the wider United States presidential election. Voters chose 11 representatives, or electors, to the Electoral College, who voted for president and vice president.

Background and vote
Following Reconstruction, Georgia would be the first former Confederate state to substantially disenfranchise its newly enfranchised freedmen and many poor whites, doing so in the early 1870s. This largely limited the Republican Party to a few North Georgia counties with substantial Civil War Unionist sentiment – chiefly Fannin but also to a lesser extent Pickens, Gilmer and Towns – and in presidential elections to a small number of counties elsewhere where blacks were not fully disenfranchised. The Democratic Party served as the guardian of white supremacy against a Republican Party historically associated with memories of Reconstruction, and the main competition became Democratic primaries, which were restricted to whites on the grounds of the Democratic Party being legally a private club. This restriction was done by local county laws, but combined with the highly efficacious cumulative poll tax introduced in 1877 meant that turnout would begin a decline to be consistently lower than any other former Confederate state except South Carolina.

Despite the failure of outgoing President Rutherford B. Hayes to convert any of the formerly Whig landowners to the GOP, Democratic nominee Winfield Scott Hancock declined by seven percent upon Samuel J. Tilden’s performance in Georgia from 1876, as mountain country whites who could pay the poll tax were nonetheless dissatisfied with the spending cuts of the “Redeemers” and their economic problems from deflation and a regressive and malapportioned tax system.

Results

Results by county

Notes

References

Georgia
1880
1880 Georgia (U.S. state) elections